Scrotal inflation, or scrotal infusion, is a sexual practice in which fluid (typically saline solution, but sometimes air or another gas) is injected into the scrotum in order to make it balloon in size. It carries a number of risks of serious complications, including scrotal cellulitis and subcutaneous emphysema, and possibly fatal complications such as Fournier's gangrene or air embolism.

See also 
 Cock and ball torture
 Medical fetish
 Hydrocele
 Pneumoscrotum

References 

BDSM terminology
Sexual acts
Scrotum